Koffi Constant Kouamé (born 28 September 1995) is an Ivorian football defender.

References 

1995 births
Living people
Ivorian footballers
Ivory Coast international footballers
ASEC Mimosas players
AS Tanda players
SC Gagnoa players
FC San-Pédro players
AS Rejiche players
Association football defenders
Ivorian expatriate footballers
Expatriate footballers in Tunisia
Ivorian expatriate sportspeople in Tunisia
Tunisian Ligue Professionnelle 1 players
People from Bondoukou